Satiation may refer to:

 Satiety, feeling "full" and satisfied after eating; the cessation of hunger
 Economic satiation, where increasing the amount of a good reduces the worth of each individual unit of it
 Predator satiation, an anti-predator adaptation involving high population densities of the prey
 Semantic satiation, where repetition of a word or phrase causes it to temporarily lose meaning
 Satiation therapy, a type of behavioral therapy

See also 
 Saturation (disambiguation)
 Snatiation

pl:Nasycenie